Data Security Council of India (DSCI) is a premier industry body on data protection in India, setup by NASSCOM®, committed to making cyberspace safe, secure and trusted by establishing best practices, standards and initiatives in cyber security and privacy. DSCI brings together national governments, their agencies, industry sectors including IT-BPM, BFSI, Telecom, industry associations, data protection authorities and think tanks for public advocacy, thought leadership, capacity building and outreach initiatives.

DSCI engages with governments, regulators, industry associations and think tanks on policy matters. To strengthen thought leadership in cyber security and privacy, DSCI develops best practices and frameworks, publishes studies, surveys and papers. It builds capacity in security, privacy and cyber forensics through training and certification program for professionals and law enforcement agencies and engages stakeholders through various outreach initiatives including events, awards, chapters, consultations and membership programs. DSCI also endeavors to increase India’s share in the global security product and services market through global trade development initiatives. These aim to strengthen the security and privacy culture in the India.

Certifications

Frameworks

External links
 

Computer security organizations
Non-profit organisations based in India
Privacy organizations
Internet governance organizations

Cyber Security in India